Severino Yunier González (born September 28, 1992) is a Panamanian professional baseball pitcher who is currently a free agent. He played in Major League Baseball (MLB) for the Philadelphia Phillies in 2015 and 2016.

Baseball career

Philadelphia Phillies
González signed with the Philadelphia Phillies as an international free agent in April 2011.

Playing for the Reading Fightin Phils in 2013, González had a 2.00 earned run average with 119 strikeouts over  innings pitched. After the season, he won the Paul Owens Award as the Phillies Minor League Pitcher of the Year.

González made his major league debut on April 28, 2015, against the St. Louis Cardinals. González appeared in 27 games for Philadelphia in 2016, registering a 5.60 ERA with 34 strikeouts in 35.1 innings pitched.

On January 19, 2017, González was designated for assignment by the Phillies following the signing of Michael Saunders.

Miami Marlins
On January 24, 2017, González was traded to the Miami Marlins for cash or a player to be named later. On February 17, 2018, González was outrighted to Triple-A. His contract was selected by Marlins on April 1. The following day, González was designated for assignment. González cleared waivers and was outrighted again to Triple-A. He was released on June 18, 2018.

Saraperos de Saltillo
On July 7, 2018, González signed with the Saraperos de Saltillo of the Mexican Baseball League. He was released on July 20, 2018.

In 2019, he was selected for Panama national baseball team at the 2019 Pan American Games Qualifier.

After the 2020 season, he played for Panama in the 2021 Caribbean Series.

Guerreros de Oaxaca
On June 5, 2022, González signed with the Guerreros de Oaxaca of the Mexican League. He was released on July 3, 2022.

International career
González was selected to represent Panama at the 2023 World Baseball Classic qualification.

References

External links

Severino González at Baseball Almanac
Severino González at Pura Pelota (Venezuelan Professional Baseball League)

1992 births
Living people
Clearwater Threshers players
Jacksonville Jumbo Shrimp players
Lakewood BlueClaws players
Lehigh Valley IronPigs players
Major League Baseball pitchers
Major League Baseball players from Panama
Mexican League baseball pitchers
National baseball team players
New Orleans Baby Cakes players
Panamanian expatriate baseball players in Mexico
Panamanian expatriate baseball players in the United States
People from Santiago District, Veraguas
Philadelphia Phillies players
Saraperos de Saltillo players
Reading Fightin Phils players
Tiburones de La Guaira players
Venezuelan Summer League Phillies players
Panamanian expatriate baseball players in Venezuela
Expatriate baseball players in Colombia
Panamanian expatriate sportspeople in Colombia
2023 World Baseball Classic players